Poropteron debruini is a species of sea snail, a marine gastropod mollusk in the family Muricidae, the murex snails or rock snails.

Description

Distribution

References

 Lorenz, F. (1989). A new Pteropurpura from South Africa (Gastropoda, Muricidae). La Conchiglia. 233-236: 49-51.

External links
 Barco, A.; Herbert, G.; Houart, R.; Fassio, G. & Oliverio, M. (2017). A molecular phylogenetic framework for the subfamily Ocenebrinae (Gastropoda, Muricidae). Zoologica Scripta. 46 (3): 322-335

Muricidae
Gastropods described in 1989